Ivan Cerioli (born 26 January 1971) is an Italian former cyclist. He competed in the team pursuit at the 1992 Summer Olympics.

References

External links
 

1971 births
Living people
Italian male cyclists
Olympic cyclists of Italy
Cyclists at the 1992 Summer Olympics
People from Codogno
Cyclists from the Province of Lodi